Kevin Jackson (born July 5, 1978 in Pittsgrove Township, New Jersey) is an American soccer player.

Career

College and Amateur
Jackson graduated from Arthur P. Schalick High School, and played college soccer at Lehigh University from 1996 to 1999. He holds the single game, season and career assists records at the school.

During his college years Jackson also played for the Central Jersey Riptide of the USL Premier Development League.

Professional
Jackson was selected in the 6th round (68th overall) of the 2000 MLS SuperDraft by Chicago Fire, and was drafted by the Hershey Wildcats of the USL A-League in the Territorial Round of the 2000 USL Draft. After Chicago waived his contract rights, Jackson signed with the Wildcats and spent the 2000 and 2001 season with the team. In 2002, he played for the South Jersey Barons, and in 2003 he moved to the Charleston Battery, playing for the team through the 2005 season.

Jackson left the Battery at the end of 2005 to work as a youth soccer coach at Daniel Island Soccer Academy, but returned to play for the Battery in 2010; he played his first competitive game in over five years on April 17, 2010, in Charleston's 2010 season opener against the Charlotte Eagles.

Honors

Charleston Battery
USL Second Division Champions (1): 2010
USL Second Division Regular Season Champions (1): 2010

References

External links
 Charleston Battery

1978 births
Living people
People from Pittsgrove Township, New Jersey
American soccer players
Arthur P. Schalick High School alumni
Central Jersey Riptide players
USL First Division players
Hershey Wildcats players
Ocean City Nor'easters players
Charleston Battery players
Lehigh Mountain Hawks men's soccer players
USL Second Division players
USL Championship players
A-League (1995–2004) players
USL League Two players
Chicago Fire FC draft picks
Association football midfielders
Sportspeople from Salem County, New Jersey
Soccer players from New Jersey